Megan Gebbia (born March 7, 1973) is currently the head coach of the Wake Forest University women's basketball team, replacing Jen Hoover on May 26, 2022.

Career
She had previously served in a similar capacity at American University for nine seasons from 2013 to 2022. A two-time Patriot League Coach of the Year in 2015 and 2018, she was the program's all-time wins leader with a 160–106 record who also led the Eagles to three NCAA Division I women's basketball tournament bids in 2015, 2018 and 2022. She was succeeded by Tiffany Coll twelve days later on June 7.

Prior to American, she spent 10 years at Marist College, including the last seven as associate head coach. She had joined the Red Foxes women's basketball coaching staff on June 4, 2003. She was an assistant coach with American in 1995–96, followed by six years at UMBC from 1996 to 2002 and Wright State in 2002–03. 

A 1990 graduate of Middletown High School, she earned a Bachelor of Science in Psychology from Towson State University in 1994.

Head Coaching Record

References

External links
 American University biography

1973 births
Living people
American Eagles women's basketball coaches
American women's basketball coaches
American women's basketball players
Basketball coaches from Maryland
Basketball players from Maryland
Marist Red Foxes women's basketball coaches
Sportspeople from Frederick, Maryland
Towson University alumni
UMBC Retrievers women's basketball coaches
Wright State Raiders women's basketball coaches
Wake Forest Demon Deacons women's basketball coaches